The International Association for the Exchange of Students for Technical Experience commonly referred to as IAESTE (pronounced i-a-es-te or ai-es-te) is an international organization exchanging students for technical work experience abroad. Students gain relevant technical training lasting from 4 weeks to 52 weeks. IAESTE includes committees representing more than 80 countries, with the potential of accepting new countries into the organization every year. At the general conference 2005 held in Cartagena, Colombia, the statute and by-laws of IAESTE a.s.b.l. were established, making IAESTE a registered "associacion sans but lucratif" (non-profit organization), with the centre in Luxembourg. The current President is Thomas Faltner from Austria. IAESTE's motto is "Work, Experience, Discover". IAESTE's aims are to connect students with employers in foreign countries, provide university students with technical experience and culturally enrich students and their host communities.

History
IAESTE was founded in 1948 at Imperial College, London. The Imperial College Vacation Work Committee headed by Mr. James Newby initiated a meeting with national organizations from 10 European countries in a post war effort to promote better understanding between countries and cultures.

Since 1948, the association has grown to include more than 80 countries worldwide and has exchanged in excess of 300,000 students. IAESTE exchanges around 7000 students annually playing an important role in giving technical undergraduates/postgraduates/graduates practical work experience and a global perspective.

Organization structure

International organization structure
The IAESTE Association is a confederation of National Committees representing academic, industrial and student interests. Coordinating the daily administration of the association is the responsibility of the President. The President is elected for two years and is responsible for the General Conference or the GC as it is called in IAESTE. The GC makes the formal decisions in IAESTE and is composed of one delegate (National Secretary) from each country. The GC meets every year in January and is a forum for discussion.

The Board is an elected body which prepares the work of the General Conference and advises the President. It is composed of four elected members and the President.

The GC is the most important event of IAESTE each year. Here every country brings job offers they have obtained in their own country. Every job is written on a standardized form stating where and when the job is, who is eligible for the job and which qualifications (language, skills, etc.) are required. The jobs are traded during the Exchange Sessions. During these sessions, countries meet and try to get the best possible jobs to bring back home. This is very hectic as countries try to get the best jobs. These jobs either have to fit pre-selected students or are open for applications from students back home.

One other notable event at the GC is the "International Party". At this party, every member country brings a national dish, drinks and clothes.

The international work is funded by member fees based on GDP per capita and the number of students sent abroad and is paid by the National Committees.

National organization structure
The National Committees represent the member countries and are composed of persons representing academic, industrial and student interests. Every full member of the IAESTE has one vote at the GC. The National Secretary is normally the person with the formal vote, even though the decisions are often made by the whole National Committee.

Each National Committee is responsible for the administration of the exchange in its own country. Membership is given after the establishment of a National Committee in accordance with the statutes of IAESTE, together with a responsible permanent secretariat. The type of secretariat which administers the exchange varies according to each country's national structure, educational system and funding policies. The essential requirement is that the national secretariat, whatever its organization and status, should have competent permanent staff.

Every country has its own way of organizing the work of IAESTE, but the National Committee can mainly be classified into four categories:
 Student-driven - The National Secretary is a student, normally serving for one to two years. Often there is one employed administrative staff for paperwork and keeping contact with other national committees, but the students are making decisions, organizing trainees and even raising funds. Examples are Norway, Denmark, Austria, Slovakia or Croatia.
 Academically - The National Secretary is a professor or employed by a university to front IAESTE on the behalf of the university or the country. Usually, they have students to welcome trainees, but students are not involved in the decision-making. Examples are Turkey, Portugal.
 Governmental - An employee of a governmental international work exchange organization is the National Secretary. Usually, the organization is responsible for several exchange programs and is quite professional. They also often employ students to welcome incoming students. Examples are Finland, Switzerland and UK.
 Other - Non-profit organizations funded by various sources (students, companies, government) but not affiliated with a single institution. Examples are China, USA.

IAESTE varies a lot from country to country and even within countries, there can be a big difference from one city to another. Traineeships also vary a lot: some countries have extended programmes with students employed to help and organize events, while in other places arriving trainees organize events themselves.

Annual Conference (AC)
The most important international event that connects IAESTE leaders from all over the world. The AC 2021 was turned into an online conference, due to the COVID-19 pandemic. A small team in Vienna coordinated the program points.

Past ACs
 2021 | Vienna Austria (online)
 2020 | Tatranská Lomnica Slovakia
 2019 | Limassol Cyprus
 2018 | Berlin Germany
 2017 | Incheon South Korea
 2016 | Prague Czech Republic
 2015 | Zagreb Croatia
 2014 | Quito Ecuador
 2013 | Belfast United Kingdom
 2012 | Skopje North Macedonia
 2011 | Bangkok Thailand
 2010 | Zurich Switzerland
 2009 | Warsaw Poland
 2008 | Amman, Dead Sea Jordan
 2007 | Lisbon Portugal
 2006 | Marsascala Malta
 2005 | Cartagena Colombia
 2004 | Vienna Austria
 2003 | Bangkok Thailand
 2002 | Trondheim Norway
 2001 | Durban South Africa
 2000 | Washington DC United States of America
 1999 | Tokyo Japan
 1998 | Cardiff United Kingdom
 1997 | Barcelona Spain
 1996 | Copenhagen Denmark
 1995 | Athens Greece
 1994 | Mexico City Mexico
 1993 | Cork Ireland
 1992 | Bonn Germany
 1991 | Nicosia Cyprus
 1990 | São Paulo Brazil
 1989 | Graz Austria
 1988 | Stockholm Sweden
 1987 | Budapest Hungary
 1986 | Lisbon Portugal
 1985 | Istanbul Turkey
 1984 | Montpellier France
 1983 | Vienna Austria
 1982 | Tokyo Japan
 1981 | Murren Switzerland
 1980 | Trondheim Norway
 1979 | Dublin Ireland
 1978 | Amsterdam Netherlands
 1977 | London United Kingdom
 1976 | Dubrovnik Yugoslavia
 1975 | Salzburg Austria
 1974 | West Berlin Germany
 1973 | Finland Helsinki MS Finlandia (ship)
 1972 | Barcelona Spain
 1971 | Copenhagen Denmark
 1970 | Lisbon Portugal
 1969 | Paris France
 1968 | Athens Greece
 1967 | Lausanne Switzerland
 1966 | Warsaw Poland
 1965 | Haifa Israel
 1964 | Lucerne Switzerland
 1963 | Munich Germany
 1962 | London United Kingdom
 1961 | Rome Italy
 1960 | Belgrade Yugoslavia
 1959 | Istanbul Turkey
 1958 | Madrid Spain
 1957 | Bad Aachen West Germany
 1956 | Trondheim Norway
 1955 | Vienna Austria
 1954 | Stockholm Sweden
 1953 | Zurich Switzerland
 1952 | Delft Netherlands
 1951 | Paris France
 1950 | Helsinki Finland
 1949 | Copenhagen Denmark
 1948 | London United Kingdom

The IAESTE Alumni Network (IAN)
The Friends of IAESTE Network (FoIN) was founded 1996 in Denmark as the official Alumni branch of IAESTE, with the goal of helping former IAESTE trainees and members keep in touch.

In 2010, FoIN was re-branded as the IAESTE Alumni Network (IAN) and an Alumni Relations Manager was appointed to oversee all activities. The current holder of this position is Bruce Wicks from the United Kingdom. In 2011, IAN launched a new, online network which currently has over 10,000 members.

IAESTE Day
In 2005, an international IAESTE Day was created, for the purpose of global promotion of the organization as well as the celebration of its aims and goals. Starting with 6 countries, IAESTE Day was celebrated in 28 of its member countries in 2007. IAESTE Day is held on 20 October every year.

JUMP
Join Us to Motivate People (JUMP) is the "Motivation and Training Seminar" of IAESTE. JUMP was founded in 1995 in Vienna, Austria on the initiative of Martin Klaus, former National Secretary of IAESTE Austria. Martin became co-ordinator of JUMP, later this role was taken over by Adrian Keller from IAESTE Switzerland and in 2009 by Tomasz (Tomek) Pawliszyn from IAESTE Poland.
JUMP is aimed to young members of IAESTE who want to explore more the organisation and meet other members of IAESTE.  

Primarily new members of IAESTE meet in a different European city each year during four days in September or October for training sessions and discussion groups. An important component is cultural exchange with corporate tours, cultural events and tours and social events incorporating local cuisine and customs. The theme song for the seminar is Jump (For My Love) by the Pointer Sisters.

Usually, 40 - 70 participants take part in the event. Each JUMP is combined of six workshop sessions, led by experienced members, that cover the essence of IAESTE activities:
Introduction to IAESTE
Administration
Company Marketing and Fundraising
Job-Raising
Local Committee Management
Student Marketing and Member-Raising
Additionally, all participants visit various information boots on the topics of summer reception, career fairs, career websites, etc. All together combined with IAESTE related games, international evening, sightseeing trip and company presentation to show that IAESTE is much more than the exchange of job offers. One of the other highlights is motivation speeches by invited guests.

Because of the global pandemic, the 2020 IAESTE JUMP Conference was virtual, hosted by IAESTE United States August 26–28, 2020.

CEC
The Central European Convention is a group of several IAESTE member countries in the specific geographic region. Those are all "student-run" countries, so students are in the decision making positions (contrary to academic or professional-run countries).

Those countries agree to meet twice a year and hold working and discussion groups. At the same time, they get to know the culture of the hosting country.

Goals
 Motivation
 Education
 Developing IAESTE
 Improve the situation of student-run countries

History
The Central European Convention (CEC) was founded in May 1998 in Tuheljske Toplice, Croatia, on the initiative of Thomas Haim, former National Secretary IAESTE AUSTRIA and Mario Kauzlaric, former National Secretary IAESTE CROATIA. Because of the great success, the CEC is held 2 times a year.

Past CECs
 43. Online (Croatia, October 2021)
 42. Kope (Slovenia, October 2019)
 41. Neum (Bosnia and Herzegovina, May 2019)
 40. Sopron (Hungary, October 2018)
 39. Wadowice (Poland, May 2018)
 38. Vienna (Austria, October 2017)
 37. Žďár nad Sázavou (Czech Republic, April 2017)
 36. Krk (Croatia, October 2016)
 35. Stara Lubovna (Slovakia, May 2016)
 34. Ljubliana (Slovenia, October 2015)
 33. Prijedor (Bosnia and Herzegovina, May 2015)
 32. Györ (Hungary, November 2014)
 31. Ustroń (Poland, May 2014)
 30. Klagenfurt (Austria, November 2013)
 29. Vyšší Brod (Czech Republic, April 2013)
 28. Maribor (Slovenia, October 2012)
 27. Trencin (Slovakia, April 2012)
 26. Zánka (Hungary, October 2011)
 25. Orahovica (Croatia, April 2011)
 24. Lackenhof (Austria, October 2010)
 23. Radějov (Czech Republic, April 2010)
 22. Bohinj (Slovenia, October 2009)
 21. Novy Smokovec (Slovakia, April 2009)
 20. Győr (Hungary, October 2008)
 19. Rijeka (Croatia, May 2008)
 18. Purbach (Austria, October 2007)
 17. Kobyli (Czech Republic, April 2007)
 16. Kranjska Gora (Slovenia, November 2006)
 15. Trencin (Slovakia Spring 2006)
 14. Sümeg (Hungary, Fall 2005)
 13. Wagrain (Austria, May 2005)
 12. Zagreb (Croatia, November 2004)
 11. Prague (Czech Republic, April 2004)
 10. Maribor (Slovenia, April 2003)
 9. Szentendre (Hungary, September 2002)
 8. Admont (Austria, May 2002)
 7. Krapinske Toplice (Croatia, November 2001)
 6. Prague (Czech Republic, May 2001)
 5. Myto pod Dumbierom (Slovakia, November 2000)
 4. Budapest (Hungary, May 2000)
 3. Kranjska Gora (Slovenia, November 1999)
 2. Oberalpendorf (Austria, December 1998)
 1. Tuheljske Toplice (Croatia, 1998)

See also
 Employment website
AIESEC

References

External links

 
Educational organisations based in Luxembourg
Engineering education
International organisations based in Luxembourg City
International student organizations
Student organizations established in 1948
Student exchange
Youth organisations based in Luxembourg